"That Girl" is by a produced and performed by American musician Pharrell featuring Pharrell's longtime collaborators American musicians Snoop Dogg and Uncle Charlie Wilson.. It was released as the final single Williams' debut studio album In My Mind (2006).

Track listing 
CD Single
That Girl (Clean) (featuring Snoop Dogg and Charlie Wilson) — 4:02
That Girl (Dirty) (featuring Snoop Dogg and Charlie Wilson) — 4:02
That Girl (Instrumental) — 4:02
That Girl (A cappella) — 4:01

References 

2006 singles
Charlie Wilson (singer) songs
Snoop Dogg songs
Pharrell Williams songs
Song recordings produced by Pharrell Williams
Songs written by Pharrell Williams
Songs written by Snoop Dogg